Henry Schoellkopf (December 14, 1879  – December 5, 1912) was an American football player and coach.  He was selected as an All-American fullback while attending Harvard Law School in 1903. He was the head coach of the Cornell Big Red football team from 1907 to 1908, compiling a record of 15–3–1.

Early life
Henry Schoellkopf was born December 14, 1879 in Buffalo, New York to Henry Schoellkopf Sr. (1848–1880) and Emily Vogel. Henry Sr. was the oldest son of Buffalo, New York businessman Jacob F. Schoellkopf and his wife, Christiana T. (Duerr) Schoellkopf.  Henry's father learned the tannery business and leather trade from Henry's grandfather, Jacob F. Schoellkopf, and later worked with Jacob's cousin and business partner, Frederick Vogel and his business partner, Guido Pfister, in Wisconsin. Henry Sr. married Vogel's daughter, Emelie (Emily) Vogel (Henry's mother) in 1875. Prior to his father's early death in 1880, he partnered with Vogel and Pfister and opened a tannery in northeast Wisconsin that eventually "became the largest in the world prior to World War I."  Henry would grow up to become the first of many Schoellkopfs to attend Cornell University when he enrolled in 1898. His sister, Paula Schoellkopf (b. 1876) married Gustav A. Reuss who had Henry Schoellkopf Reuss (1912–2002).

He attended Cornell University, graduating with a Bachelor of Arts degree in 1902. While at Cornell, he was president of both the Quill and Dagger society and the Zeta Psi Fraternity. Henry received a law degree from Harvard University, where he continued to play football. Returning to Cornell, he served as a graduate coach before leaving to enter a law firm in Milwaukee, Wisconsin.

Career
Schoellkopf began his career as a football player at the Cascadilla School, where he played fullback. He then enrolled at Cornell and played college football for the Cornell Big Red football team from 1900 to 1901, contributing to the development of the original Slope Day iteration. After graduating from Cornell in 1902, Schoellkopf enrolled at Harvard Law School where he played for the Harvard Crimson football team while he was a second-year law student at Harvard in 1903.  He played principally at the fullback position and some at the halfback position.  While playing at Harvard, Schoellkopf was 23 years old, 5 feet 10 inches tall, and weighed 183 pounds.  After the 1903 college football season, Schoellkopf was selected as a first-team All-American fullback by Fielding H. Yost, Charles Chadwick, and the San Antonio Daily Light.

In 1907 and 1908, after graduating from Law School, he served as the head coach of Cornell's football team.  In two years as Cornell's coach, Schoellkopf compiled a record of 15 wins, three losses and one tie.  His winning percentage of .816 ranks second all-time among Cornell coaches, trailing only Raymond Starbuck but ranking ahead of Pop Warner.

After coaching, Schoellkopf moved to Milwaukee, Wisconsin, where he became a member in the law firm of Marksam & Schoellkopf and one of the most well known attorneys in Milwaukee.

Personal life

In Milwaukee, he married Catherine and together they had a daughter.

In December 1912, he committed suicide by shooting himself in the head with a revolver while alone in his office in Milwaukee. He was aged 32 at the time of his death. Following Schoellkopf's death his close friend, Willard Straight, donated $100,000 to construct the Schoellkopf Memorial Hall in his honor. In response to Straight's gift, members of the Schoellkopf family and the Zeta Psi Fraternity donated $70,000 for the construction of Schoellkopf Field in honor of the Schoellkopf family patriarch, Jacob F. Schoellkopf.

Head coaching record

See also
 1903 College Football All-America Team

References

External links
 

1879 births
1912 suicides
American football fullbacks
American football halfbacks
Cornell Big Red football coaches
Cornell Big Red football players
Harvard Crimson football players
Harvard Law School alumni
Wisconsin lawyers
Sportspeople from Buffalo, New York
Sportspeople from Milwaukee
Players of American football from Buffalo, New York
Suicides by firearm in Wisconsin
Schoellkopf family
American people of German descent
19th-century American lawyers
Players of American football from Milwaukee